The Bund Reichskriegsflagge (Imperial War Flag Society) or the Verband Reichskriegsflagge (Imperial War Flag Union) was a paramilitary organization founded by Ernst Röhm in 1923.

The Bund Reichskriegsflagge was formed from the local groups of Memmingen, Schleißheim, Augsburg and Munich of the Wehrverband Reichsflagge (Imperial Flag Combat League), which had previously been expelled for insubordination.  The official leader was Joseph Seydel but Ernst Röhm was really in control.  Political leadership was transferred to Adolf Hitler on September 25, 1923.  It was part of the Kampfbund. The Bund Reichskriegsflagge under Ernst Röhm was instrumental in the Beer Hall Putsch—the unsuccessful attempt by Hitler and the Nazi Party (NSDAP) to seize power in Munich in November 1923. Both it and the NSDAP were banned afterwards. The Bund Reichskriegsflagge was briefly resurrected in 1925, then merged with the Tannenbergbund.

Notable members
Ernst Röhm
Heinrich Himmler 
Adolf Hühnlein

References 
 Ernst Röhm: Die Geschichte eines Hochverräters. Eher, München 1928 (Nachdruck der 6. Auflage, Eher, München 1934: Faksimile-Verlag, Bremen 1982 (Historische Faksimiles)).
 Harold J. Gordon: Hitlerputsch 1923. Machtkampf in Bayern 1923–1924. Bernard & Graefe, Frankfurt am Main 1971, .
 Werner Maser: Die Frühgeschichte der NSDAP. Hitlers Weg bis 1924. Athenäum-Verlag, Frankfurt am Main u. a. 1965.

External links 
Bund Reichskriegsflagge im Historischen Lexikon Bayerns

Early Nazism (–1933)
Paramilitary organisations of the Weimar Republic
Military units and formations established in 1923
Military units and formations disestablished in 1923
Military units and formations established in 1925
1923 establishments in Germany
1923 disestablishments in Germany
1925 establishments in Germany